General elections were held in Burma between 1 and 15 January 1978. The country was a one-party state at the time, with the Burma Socialist Programme Party as the sole legal party. It therefore won all 464 seats in People's Assembly. Voter turnout was reported to be 93.3%.

Results

References

1978 in Burma
Elections in Myanmar
Burma
One-party elections
Election and referendum articles with incomplete results